My Rock is the second studio album by Canadian reggae band Walk Off the Earth, released on July 30, 2010 through SlapDash Records. It contains two rerecorded, remixed and remastered tracks that originally appeared on Smooth Like Stone on a Beach.

Track list

Personnel
Walk Off the Earth
Gianni Luminati – bass guitar, vocals, guitar, drums
Ryan Marshall – guitar, vocals, bass guitar
Pete Kirkwood – drums, percussion

Production
Production, engineering, mixing and mastering by Gianni Luminati

Walk Off the Earth albums
2010 albums